The 2001–02 season was Hellas Verona F.C.'s second consecutive season in second division of the Italian football league, the Serie B, and the 99th as a football club.

Players

First-team quad

Pre-season and friendlies

Competitions

Overall record

Serie A

League table

Results summary

Results by round

Matches

Coppa Italia

References

Hellas Verona F.C. seasons
Hellas Verona